The Ipswich Jazz Festival is a jazz music and arts festival held in Ipswich, Suffolk. The first event was held in 2015 in partnership with the Ipswich Arts Festival and mixes established talent, rising stars and regional players. It also features art and photography exhibitions, film screenings and workshops held in venues across the town.

Local Musicians
The festival organisers have been keen to promote up and coming talent and the festival features a number of performances by local jazz musicians.

Exhibitions, Films and Workshops
The festival also features art and photographic exhibitions and screenings of classic jazz films. Jazz workshops allow everyone to get involved in making music.

Jazz musicians at Ipswich Jazz Festival
Jazz musicians who have performed at the Ipswich Jazz Festival

2015

Big names
Clare Teal, Zoe Francis, Jim Mullen, Noemi Nuti, Jason Rebello, Andrew McCormack, Quentin Collins, Mick Hutton.

Local Musicians
Morphology, Jazz Arrivals, Last Orders, Phoenix Jazz, Haunted Kitchen, Steam on my Clothes, Body and Soul, Weird Rare Animal

Exhibitions, Films and Workshops
Jazz Art and Artifacts Exhibition, Jazz Camera exhibition by John Watson, Mo' Better Blues, The Man with the Jazz Guitar (biography of Ken Sykora), Jazz Drumming for Absolute Beginners, Learn How to Sing Jazz, Jazz Masterclass with Clare Teal's band.

References

External links
 http://www.ipswichjazzfestival.org.uk/
 https://web.archive.org/web/20150702134036/http://www.jazzjournal.co.uk/jazz-latest-news/923/review-ipswich-jazz-festival
 https://web.archive.org/web/20150701101624/http://www.insuffolk.com/first-ipswich-jazz-festival-this-june/
 https://web.archive.org/web/20150924040029/http://www.ipswich-waterfront.co.uk/ipswich-jazz-festival-2015/

Jazz festivals in the United Kingdom
Music festivals in Suffolk
Annual events in England
Music festivals established in 2015
2015 establishments in England
Ipswich